William N. Deramus IV (born April 15, 1944) was the fourteenth president of Kansas City Southern Railway.

References
 Kansas City Southern Historical Society, The Kansas City Southern Lines. Retrieved August 15, 2005.

1944 births
20th-century American railroad executives
Kansas City Southern Railway
Living people
20th-century American businesspeople